Jacques Rit (born 1949) is a former politician and orthodontist. He served as a member of the National Council until the dissolution of the National Council of the 5th of February - in which he decided not to stand. Following the COVID-19 Pandemic, Rit was made the President of the Special Commission for the Analysis of the COVID-19 Crisis.

References

Living people
1949 births
Members of the National Council (Monaco)